Longville is an unincorporated community in Plumas County, California. It lies at an elevation of 4400 feet (1341 m).

The Longville post office operated from 1861 to 1918. The name honors W.B. Long hotelier and saw mill owner.

References

Unincorporated communities in California
Unincorporated communities in Plumas County, California
1861 establishments in California